The 2018 ITTF World Tour was the 23rd season of the International Table Tennis Federation's professional table tennis world tour.

For the first time in its history, the tour included mixed doubles competitions in 2018. They featured at six events: the China Open, Japan Open, Korea Open, Australian Open and Austrian Open, as well as at the Grand Finals. This was to promote the mixed doubles category prior to its inclusion on the 2020 Olympics programme.

Schedule

The tournaments in the 2018 tour were split into two tiers: World Tour Platinum and World Tour. The Platinum events offered higher prize money and more points towards the ITTF World Tour standings, which determined the qualifiers for the ITTF World Tour Grand Finals in December.

Below is the 2018 schedule announced by the International Table Tennis Federation:

Key

Results

Grand Finals

The 2018 ITTF World Tour Grand Finals took place in Incheon, South Korea, from 13 to 16 December 2018.

See also
2018 World Team Table Tennis Championships
2018 ITTF Men's World Cup
2018 ITTF Women's World Cup
2018 ITTF Team World Cup
2018 ITTF Challenge Series
2018 in table tennis

References

External links
International Table Tennis Federation

 
ITTF World Tour
World Tour